Ravivalsa is a village in Tekkali Mandalam of Srikakulam district of Andhra Pradesh state, India. Ravivalasa is famous for its Sri Endala Mallikarjuna Swamy Temple.

References 

Villages in Srikakulam district